Feleknas Uca (born 17 September 1976) is a Turkish politician of Kurdish descent. From 1999 to 2009, she was member of the European Parliament from Germany, serving with Die Linke. Feleknas Uca was at one time the world's only Yazidi parliamentarian until the Iraqi legislature was elected in 2005. In June 2015, she was elected as a Member of Parliament in Turkey representing Diyarbakır.

Life and work 
Feleknas Uca was born in Celle, Lower Saxony, West Germany to an immigrant Yazidi family originally from Turkey. She graduated from Comprehensive School in Celle before taking an apprenticeship as a doctor's assistant, and completed her Abitur by distance learning. In 2010 she established the Feleknas Uca Foundation which focuses of the women and children rights. Uca was also the local spokesperson for representative of Terre des Femmes. Until July 2014, Feleknas Uca lived in Celle until she relocated to Diyarbakir in Turkey.

Political career

In Europe 
In 1999, aged 22, she was elected to the European Parliament fifth of six places on the Party of Democratic Socialism national list. In the 5th European Parliament (1999–2004), she sat on the Parliament's committees on Culture, Education and the Media and Equal Opportunities. She maintained close links with pro-Kurdish groups in Turkey. She was a member of the EU-Turkey joint parliamentary committee.

In the PDS' selection of candidates for elections to the 6th European Parliament (2004–2009), Uca slipped to seventh place on the PDS national list, putting her seat under severe pressure. However, in the elections, she was returned in the last successful place.

While serving in the European Parliament, she attracted controversy within Turkey for her pro-Kurdish stances. In 2005, the Democratic People's Party (DEHAP) was investigated by Turkish police for a speech given by Uca in the Kurdish language in which she called for the decrease of the electoral threshold from 10%, declare a general amnesty and suspend all military actions.

In 2009, Uca left the European Parliament. In 2012, she was detained in Turkey's Istanbul Airport for attempting to take a large number of B-1 vitamins to Kurdish prisoners in Turkish prisons and was deported to Germany.

In Turkey 
In July 2014, Uca resettled to Diyarbakır, the largest Kurdish populated city in Turkey. On 7 April 2015, Uca was nominated by the HDP to their electoral list for the upcoming parliamentary election as one of a number of Yazidis running for office. In the general elections on 7 June 2015 and 1 November 2015 she was elected a  the Grand National Assembly of Turkey, both times representing the HDP for Diyarbakir. Turkish press reports write that she is the first ever Yazidi member of the Assembly along with Ali Atalan. In May 2016, her parliamentary immunity was lifted, which was condemned by several European politicians. She was re-elected in the Parliamentary Elections on 24 June 2018.

Political positions

Kurdish politics 
She was a member of the MP delegation in march to Cizre during the Curfew of Cizre in 2015.  She is a supporter of the use of the Kurdish language, and opposes the prohibition of theater plays, events in the Kurdish language and the detention of people who teach in Kurdish language. She supports the co-chair system implemented in the municipalities governed by the Democratic Regions Party (DBP) and condemns the fact that the state appointed trustees assumed as acting mayors instead of the elected mayors of the BDP.

Foreign politics 
She is a member of the EU-Turkey partner delegation for Turkey and the co-spokesperson for foreign relations of the HDP. She supports the autonomous Government in Syrian Kurdistan led by the Democratic Union Party (PYD). She is also grateful to the Kurdistan Workers' Party (PKK) for their defense of the Yazidi against the Islamic State (IS) in Iraq.

Legal prosecution 
In 2017 she was prosecuted for spreading terror propaganda. The State Prosecutor at the Court of Cassation in Turkey Bekir Şahin filed a lawsuit before the Constitutional Court on the 17 March 2021, demanding for Uca and 686 other HDP politicians a five-year ban for political activities. The lawsuit was filed together with a request for the HDP to be shut down due to the parties alleged organizational links with the PKK.

Personal life 
She is prepared to be detained in any moment and keeps a packed suitcase ready with her belongings in the case of an arrest.

See also 
 Yazidis in Turkey

References

External links 

 Official website

1976 births
20th-century women MEPs for Germany
21st-century women MEPs for Germany
Deputies of Diyarbakır
German people of Kurdish descent
German Yazidis
21st-century Kurdish women politicians
Living people
Members of the 25th Parliament of Turkey
Members of the 26th Parliament of Turkey
Members of the 27th Parliament of Turkey
MEPs for Germany 1999–2004
MEPs for Germany 2004–2009
People from Celle
Peoples' Democratic Party (Turkey) politicians
The Left (Germany) MEPs
21st-century Turkish women politicians
Turkish Yazidis
Yazidi women